Koninklijke Sporting Club Lokeren Oost-Vlaanderen (often simply called Sporting Lokeren or Lokeren) was a Belgian professional football club based in the city of Lokeren, in the province of East Flanders. The club was founded in 1923 but ceased to exist in 2020 after going bankrupt. A few days after the bankruptcy, the club announced that rather than dissolving entirely, it would merge with KSV Temse to form Lokeren-Temse, starting in the Belgian Second Amateur Division (fourth level).

Lokeren first reached the first division in 1974–75. Since then, it had a short spell in the Second Division between 1993–94 and 1995–96. Lokeren had its most successful period in the 1980s, achieving second place in the league in 1980–81 as well as a Belgian Cup final the same year. Its best European result was reaching the quarter-final of the 1980–81 UEFA Cup. In the year 2000, the club merged with K Sint-Niklase SKE. They were registered to the Royal Belgian Football Association with the matricule number 282. Lokeren's colours were white, black and yellow. They played their home games at the Daknamstadion.

In 2012, Sporting Lokeren won the Belgian Cup, the club's first-ever honours, after beating KV Kortrijk in the Cup Final. They won their second Cup just two years later, after beating Zulte Waregem 1–0.

History
The matricule No. 282 was given in 1920 to a club named Football Club Racing Club Lokeren (nicknamed Racing FC), but the team stopped its activity the next year. On 22 January 1923 Racing Club Lokeren was founded.  Between 1945 and 1951, it had a slight name change (to Racing Athletiek- en Football Club Lokeren) and the new name since 1951 was Koninklijke Racing Club Lokeren. Due to financial problems, the fusion with the other team from the town (Koninklijke Standaard FC Lokeren) became necessary in 1970. The new club was then named Koninklijke Sporting Club Lokeren.

In 2000, the club merged with Koninklijke Sint-Niklaas SKE to form Sporting Lokeren Sint-Niklaas Waasland. The latest name change occurred in 2003, with the province name added to the club name.

In 2018, Sporting Lokeren were relegated to the First Division B, the second tier of Belgian football. In 2019, the club was taken over by a group led by Louis de Vries and Alexander Janssen, taking the positions of president and CEO respectively.

On 20 April 2020, the club was declared bankrupt during the 2019–20 season. Lokeren had outstanding debts of €5 million and was not able to pay its staff and players anymore.

On 22 April 2020, Lokeren agreed to merge with KSV Temse to form a new club in K.S.C. Lokeren-Temse and to start in the Second Amateur Division, the national fourth level.

Honours
Belgian First Division:
Runners-up (1): 1980–81
Belgian Second Division:
Winners (1): 1995–96
Belgian Cup:
Winners (2): 2011–12, 2013–14
Runners-up (1): 1980–81
Belgian Super Cup:
Runners-up (2): 2012, 2014

European record

Final squad

Notable players
The following is a provisional list of notable players who played for Lokeren, sorted by nationality.

Managers

 Guy Thys (1 July 1958 – 30 June 1959)
 Frans De Bruyne (1970–71)
 Armand Jurion (1971–74)
 Ladislav Novák (1974–77)
 Han Grijzenhout (1977–78)
 Leon Nollet (1978)
 Urbain Braems (1978–79)
 Urbain Haesaert &  Josef Vacenovský (1979–81)
 Robert Waseige (1 July 1981–83)
 Dimitri Davidovic (1 July 1983 – 30 June 1985)
 Aimé Anthuenis (1985–87)
 Wim Jansen &  Włodzimierz Lubański (1 July 1987–88)
 Aimé Anthuenis (1 July 1988–92)
 Aimé Anthuenis &  Josef Vacenovský (1992 – Jan 93)
 Chris van Puyvelde (1993–94)
 Fi Van Hoof (1995 – Aug 97)
 Willy Reynders (1997 – Aug 99)
 R. Cossey &  R. Van Geneugden (int.) (Aug 1999)
 Georges Leekens (Sept 10, 1999– 30 June 2001)
 Paul Put (1 July 2001 – 27 Oct 2003)
 Franky Van der Elst (27 Oct 2003 – 20 Dec 2004)
 Slavoljub Muslin (24 May 2005 – 31 Dec 2005)
 Aimé Anthuenis (1 Jan 2006 – 26 Feb 2006)
 Rudi Cossey (26 Feb 2006 – 30 June 2006)
 Ariël Jacobs (1 July 2006 – 29 Oct 2006)
 Rudi Cossey (interim) (Nov 2006)
 Slavoljub Muslin (26 Nov 2006 – 30 June 2007)
 Georges Leekens (1 July 2007 – 31 March 2009)
 Freddy Heirman (interim) (1 April 2009 – 7 April 2009)
 Aleksandar Janković (7 April 2009 – 25 Oct 2009)
 Jacky Mathijssen (25 Oct 2009 – 25 Jan 2010)
 Emilio Ferrera (28 Jan 2010 – 30 June 2010)
 Peter Maes (1 July 2010 – 30 June 2015)
 Bob Peeters (1 July 2015 – 25 Oct 2015)
 Georges Leekens (25 Oct 2015 – 25 Nov 2016)
 Rúnar Kristinsson (28 Oct 2016 – 9 Aug 2017)
 Peter Maes (9 Aug 2017 – 28 October 2018)
  Trond Sollied (30 October 2018 – 20 January 2019)
 Glen De Boeck (20 January 2019 – 17 November 2019)
 Stijn Vreven (19 November 2019 – 20 April 2020)

References

External links

 Lokeren at UEFA.COM
 Lokeren at EUFO.DE
 Lokeren at Weltfussball.de
 Lokeren at Football Squads.co.uk
 Lokeren at National Football Teams.com
 Lokeren at Football-Lineups.com

 
Association football clubs established in 1923
Association football clubs disestablished in 2020
Defunct football clubs in Belgium
1923 establishments in Belgium
2020 disestablishments in Belgium
Sport in East Flanders
Belgian Pro League clubs
Lokeren